Honey Bunny is a female rabbit cartoon character and the girlfriend of Bugs Bunny. Honey Bunny, Honeybunnies, or Honeybunny may also refer to:

 "Honey Bunny", "Pumpkin"'s pet name for Yolanda, his girlfriend and fellow robber in the film Pulp Fiction (1994)
 Honeybunny (2004), a thriller short film directed by Noah Harald and starring Fiona Gubelmann, Alex Weed, and Michael Yavnielli
 Honey Bunny! (manga), a manga by Ryo Ikuemi, published by Shueisha
 "Honey Bunny" (12 September 1998), an episode of Casualty,  directed by Paul Wroblewski, written by Jeff Povey, and starring Derek Thompson, Ian Bleasdale, Jonathan Kerrigan
 "The Honeybunnies" (26 November 1985), an episode of George Burns Comedy Week

See also
 Honey Bunch
 Honeybun
 Honeybunch